The Uruguay national football team represents the country of Uruguay in international association football. It is fielded by Uruguayan Football Association, the governing body of football in Uruguay, and competes as a member of the CONMEBOL. As hundreds of players have played for the team since it started officially registering its players, only players with 20 or more official caps are included in this list.

On 20 June 2013, Diego Forlán became the first player to play 100 official matches for Uruguay. Since then, seven other players – Maxi Pereira, Diego Godín, Cristian Rodríguez, Edinson Cavani, Luis Suárez, Fernando Muslera and Martín Cáceres – have went on to achieve this milestone.

List of players

See also
 Football in Uruguay
 Uruguay national football team records and statistics
 List of Uruguay national football team hat-tricks

References

External links
FIFA page on Uruguay

Uruguay
-
Association football player non-biographical articles